The Santax was a French automobile manufactured by Cyclecars Le Santax of Paris from 1920 until 1927. It was a small cyclecar built with Anzani single-cylinder engines of 125 cc and got its name from being free of tax due to its small engine.

A larger 500 cc model followed in 1926.

References
David Burgess Wise, The New Illustrated Encyclopedia of Automobiles.

Defunct motor vehicle manufacturers of France
Cyclecars